George Harvey Idris Harding (born 12 October 1996) is an English cricketer. He made his List A debut for Durham in the 2017 Royal London One-Day Cup on 3 May 2017. He made his first-class debut for Durham in the 2017 County Championship on 26 May 2017.

References

External links
 

1996 births
Living people
English cricketers
Durham cricketers
Cricketers from Poole
Staffordshire cricketers
Northumberland cricketers